Piéla is a department or commune of Gnagna Province in northern Burkina Faso. Its capital lies at the town of Piela.

Bad Münstereifel is a twin town of Piéla. From there the commune gets help to help themselves, so that for example the drinking water supply could be saved.

Towns and villages

External links
 Homepage of the relationship between Piéla - Bad Münstereifel (GERMAN)

References

Departments of Burkina Faso
Gnagna Province